Gyrostoma is a genus of cnidarians belonging to the family Actiniidae.

The species of this genus are found in America, Africa.

Species:

Gyrostoma dubium 
Gyrostoma dysancritum 
Gyrostoma euchlorum 
Gyrostoma incertum 
Gyrostoma inequale 
Gyrostoma monodi 
Gyrostoma sanctithomae 
Gyrostoma selkirkii 
Gyrostoma stimpsonii 
Gyrostoma triste 
Gyrostoma tulearense

References

Actiniidae
Hexacorallia genera